Sardor Kulmatov (Uzbek Latin: Sardor Kulmatov; Russian: Сардар Кулматов; (born 22 August 1994) is a Uzbek professional footballer who plays as a centre-back for Malaysia Super League club Terengganu.

Club career

Sogdiana

Kulmatov started his career with Sogdiana. He was voted 2018 Player of the Year.

Terengganu
On 2 January 2023, Kulmatov signed a one-year contract with Malaysia Super League club Terengganu.

International career

Kulmatov has been called up for the Uzbekistan national football team.

Style of play

Besides center-back, he can play as left-back, right-back, and defensive midfielder. He is known for his height and physicality.

Honours
Sogdiana
 Uzbekistan Super League: 2021

References

External links
 

1994 births
Living people
Uzbekistani footballers
Uzbekistani expatriate footballers
Uzbekistani expatriate sportspeople in Malaysia
Association football defenders
Uzbekistan Super League players
FC Sogdiana Jizzakh players
Malaysia Super League players
Terengganu FC players